Cubará is a town and municipality in Boyacá Department, Colombia also referred to as the Boyacá Frontier District for sharing an international border with the Bolivarian Republic of Venezuela.

Climate
Cubará has a very wet tropical rainforest climate (Af).

References

External links
 Cubara official website

Municipalities of Boyacá Department